The Canon de 105 modèle 1930 Schneider was a field gun used by the armies of Greece, Denmark, and Poland during World War II.  It used the same sprung single-axle split-trail carriage as the Schneider 149 mm Modele 1929 howitzer. The gun had steel wheels with solid rubber tires and could be towed by either a horse-team or artillery tractor. It used the cumbersome Schneider-trademark spade plates that had to be hammered into the ground to anchor the gun in place.

The German Army designated these guns 10.5 cm Kanone 310(g) and 10.5 cm Kanone 321(d) respectively, but it is unknown if they actually used them themselves.

References 
 Chamberlain, Peter & Gander, Terry. Light and Medium Field Artillery. New York: Arco, 1975

External links 
 http://www.dws-xip.pl/encyklopedia/arm30-dk/
 http://www.dws-xip.pl/wojna/bron/polska/p38.html
 http://forsvaret.dk/OKSBL/OM%20OKSB%C3%98LLEJREN/HISTORIE/1929%20-%201940/Pages/default.aspx
 https://forum.ioh.pl/viewtopic.php?p=252850

World War II field artillery
105 mm artillery
Schneider Electric]